The Estonian Meistriliiga is the name of the professional handball league of Estonia.

Competition Format 

The season begins with a tournament between the six teams. The first four teams qualify for a play-off round. The top two teams of the play-off round qualifies directly to the semifinals, while the others two plays the top two teams of the play-out round in quarterfinals.

2022/23 Season participants

The following 6 clubs compete in Meistriliiga during the 2022–23 season.

Meistriliiga past champions

 1992 : Valga Maret-Sport
 1993 : HC Kehra
 1994 : HC Kehra (2)
 1995 : HC Kehra (3)
 1996 : HC Kehra (4)
 1997 : Viimsi HC
 1998 : Põlva Serviti
 1999 : HC Kehra (5)
 2000 : Põlva Serviti (2)
 2001 : Põlva Serviti (3)
 2002 : Põlva Serviti (4)
 2003 : HC Kehra (6)
 2004 : HC Kehra (7)
 2005 : 
 2006 : HC Kehra (8)
 2007 : Põlva Serviti (5)
 2008 : Põlva Serviti (6)
 2009 : HC Kehra (9)
 2010 : Põlva Serviti (7)
 2011 : Põlva Serviti (8) 
 2012 : HC Kehra (10)
 2013 : Põlva Serviti (9)
 2014 : HC Kehra (11)
 2015 : Põlva Serviti (10)
 2016 : Põlva Serviti (11)
 2017 : Põlva Serviti (12) 
 2018 : Põlva Serviti (13)
 2019 : Põlva Serviti (14)
 2021 : Põlva Serviti (15)
 2022 : Põlva Serviti (16)

EHF coefficient ranking
For season 2017/2018, see footnote

26.  (23)  A1 Ethniki (8.00)
27.  (36)  Olís deildin (7.00)
28.  (34)  Meistriliiga (6.83)
29.  (29)  Superliga (6.67)
30.  (21)  Sales Lentz League (6.00)

References

External links
Official website

Meistriliiga
Estonia
Sports leagues established in 1992
1992 establishments in Estonia
Handball